The Chesapeake Tide were a former professional Indoor Football team based in Upper Marlboro, Maryland.  The team began play in 2007 as an expansion team in the Continental Indoor Football League. The founding owner of the Tide was Martin Johnson. The Tide played its home games at The Show Place Arena. Midway through the 2008 season the team was acquired by Messay Hailermariam. Hailermariam folded the team at the end of the season and founded the Maryland Maniacs. Despite playing in the same arena with the same head coach, the Maniacs were not a continuation of the Tide.

Franchise history

2007
The Tide's inaugural game drew in a crowd of 3,176 fans.

Schedule

Standings

2008
The Tide won the final game of their existence, on the road, against the New Jersey Revolution. The team was led by 7 touchdown passes from quarterback Joe Urso, and running back - wide receiver Darryl Overton's four scores (three receiving, one rushing), wide receiver's Daryl Disbrow Jr. and Ray McCarter were also recipients of Urso's touchdown passes.

Schedule

Standings

References

External links
 Official Maryland Maniacs website
 Official Chesapeake Tide website
 Tide's 2007 Stats

Defunct American football teams in Maryland
Former Continental Indoor Football League teams
Prince George's County, Maryland
American football teams established in 2006
American football teams disestablished in 2008